The Statute Law (Repeals) Act 1973 is an Act of the Parliament of the United Kingdom, which implemented recommendations contained in the fourth report on statute law revision, by the Law Commission and the Scottish Law Commission.

This Act was partly in force in Great Britain at the end of 2010.

The Act

Section 2 
Amendments

In section 2(1), the words from "but nothing" onwards were repealed by section 1(1) of, and Part XIII of Schedule 1 to, the Statute Law (Repeals) Act 1977. In that section, the words ", except as provided by paragraph 2(2) of Schedule 2 to this Act" were repealed by Group 1 of Part IX of Schedule 1 to the Statute Law (Repeals) Act 1998.

In section 2(2), the words from "or the Isle of Man" to the end were repealed by Group 1 of Part IX of Schedule 1 to the Statute Law (Repeals) Act 1998.

Orders under this section

The power conferred by section 2(2) was exercised by
The Statute Law (Repeals) Act 1973 (Colonies) Order 1976 (SI 1976/54)
The Statute Law Repeals (Isle of Man) Order 1984 (SI 1984/1692).

The Orders in Council made under section 2(2) have lapsed because of the repeal made to that section by the Statute Law (Repeals) Act 1998.

Schedule 1 
This Schedule, except for Parts II, VI and XI and the savings specified at the end of those Parts, was repealed by Group 1 of Part IX of Schedule 1 to the Statute Law (Repeals) Act 1998.

Schedule 2 
In paragraph 2(2), the words from "but nothing" onwards were repealed by section 1(1) of, and Part XIII of Schedule 1 to, the Statute Law (Repeals) Act 1977. Paragraph 2 was repealed by Group 1 of Part IX of Schedule 1 to the Statute Law (Repeals) Act 1998.

Paragraph 3 was repealed by section 10(2) of, and Schedule 3 to, the House of Commons Disqualification Act 1975.

Paragraph 4 was repealed by section 1(1) of, and Group 1 of Part 2 of Schedule 1 to, the Statute Law (Repeals) Act 2004.

See also
Statute Law (Repeals) Act

References

Citations

Notes

Bibliography 

 
 

United Kingdom Acts of Parliament 1973